Edward Poelstra (born August 26, 1970) is a former member of the Arizona House of Representatives. He served in the House from January 2001 through January 2003, serving district 14. After redistricting in 2002, he ran for re-election in District 28, but lost in the general election to David Bradley and Ted Downing.

References

Republican Party members of the Arizona House of Representatives
1970 births
Living people